Burnell Joseph Dent (born March 16, 1963 in New Orleans, Louisiana) is a former professional American football linebacker in the National Football League (NFL).

Playing career

High School career
Dent from St. Rose, Louisiana played high school football at Destrehan High School in Destrehan, Louisiana where he became the school’s all-time leading tackler and was named All-State in 1981.

College career
Dent played collegiately at Tulane University from 1982 to 1985. He finished his career as the Green Wave's all-time leader in career tackles with 492 and tackles in a season with 172. In 1998, Dent was inducted into the Tulane Athletics Hall of Fame.

Professional career
Dent played linebacker for the Green Bay Packers from 1986 to 1992 and the New York Giants in 1993. He played in 95 games in his NFL career, with a total of 4.5 sacks and an interception.

References

1963 births
Living people
People from St. Rose, Louisiana
Players of American football from New Orleans
American football linebackers
Destrehan High School alumni
Tulane Green Wave football players
Green Bay Packers players
New York Giants players